is a Japanese novelist best known for writing , which was adapted into a popular anime series. She is married to Yukito Ayatsuji, the author of the horror novel Another.

Biography 

Her name after marriage to AYATSUJI Yukito, is UCHIDA Fuyumi, but she writes under her maiden name, which is Ono Fuyumi.

Before she started work on The Twelve Kingdoms, Fuyumi Ono wrote , a horror novel about a boy from another world. She later worked certain events from this novel into the Twelve Kingdoms series. In February, 2008, a new Twelve Kingdoms short story, "Hisho no Tori" (丕緒の鳥) was published in Shinchosha's Yomyom magazine.

On March 18, 2007, according to an interview at the Anime News Network, she is "currently rewriting a girls’ horror series (she) wrote long ago".

Major works 
 Akuryo Series (1989–92, 8 light novel volumes, Kodansha)
 Ghost Hunt (also known as Nightmare Dwelling) (1994, 2 light novel volumes, Kodansha) – continuation of Akuryo Series but in a different setting
 The Twelve Kingdoms (1992–2019, 9 novels and 2 short story collections, Kodansha, later Shinchosha)
 Shiki (1998, novel in 2 volumes)

Works

Evil Spirit Series
 Evil Spirit series (悪霊シリーズ - Akuryō series), Kodansha.
There are lots of Evil Spirits?! (悪霊がいっぱい!?) 1989. 
There are really lots of Evil Spirits! (悪霊がホントにいっぱい!), 1989. 
Too many Evil Spirits to sleep (悪霊がいっぱいで眠れない), 1990. 
A lonely Evil Spirit (悪霊はひとりぼっち) 1990. 
I Don't Want to Become an Evil Spirit! (悪霊になりたくない!), 1991. 
Don't Call me an Evil Spirit (悪霊とよばないで), 1991. 
I don't mind Evil Spirits 1 (悪霊だってヘイキ!〈上〉), 1992. 
I don't mind Evil Spirits 2 (悪霊だってヘイキ!〈下〉), 1992.

Ghost Hunt Series
 Ghost Hunt Series (ゴースト・ハントシリーズ) A continuation of the Evil Spirit series, but in a different setting
 Nightmare Dwelling 1 (悪夢の棲む家(上)), 1994, Kodansha. 
Nightmare Dwelling 2 (悪夢の棲む家(下)), 1994, Kodansha.

The Twelve Kingdoms
The Twelve Kingdoms series (十二国記), Kodansha, unless otherwise noted
Shadow of the Moon, Sea of the Shadow (月の影 影の海), 1992.  US Publication: 3/2007, Tokyopop  as The Twelve Kingdoms: Sea of Shadow
Sea of the Wind, Shore of the Labyrinth (風の海 迷宮の岸), 1993.  US Publication: 3/2008, Tokyopop  as The Twelve Kingdoms: Sea of Wind
Sea God of the East, Vast Sea of the West (東の海神 西の滄海), 1994.  US Publication: 3/2009, Tokyopop  as The Twelve Kingdoms: The Vast Spread of the Seas
 A Thousand Miles of Wind, the Sky of Dawn (風の万里 黎明の空), 1994.  US Publication: 3/2010, Tokyopop  as The Twelve Kingdoms: Skies of Dawn
Aspired Wings (図南の翼), 1996. 
 "Drifting Ship" (漂舶), 1997 (short story)
 Shore at Dusk, Sky at Dawn (黄昏の岸 暁の天), 2001. 
Kashou's Dream (華胥の幽夢), 2001. 
Prosperity in Winter (冬栄), originally published 4/2001 IN☆POCKET
 Kashou (華胥), originally published 5/2001 Mephisto
 Jougetsu (乗月)
Correspondence (書簡)
 Kizan (帰山)
"The Birds of Hisho" (丕緒の鳥) 2/2008 (short story, published in Yomyom magazine)
 "Rakusho no Goku" (落照の獄) 9/2009 (short story, published in Yomyom magazine)
 The Birds of Hisho (丕緒の鳥), 2013, Shinchosha, 
 Silver Ruins, Black Moon (白銀の墟 玄の月), 2019, Shinchosha
Demon's Child (魔性の子　Mashō no Ko), 1991, Kodansha. . Loosely associated with The Twelve Kingdoms series

Other Novels
Can't Sleep on Birthday Eve (バースデー・イブは眠れない) 1988, Kodansha
Mephisto and Waltz! (メフィストとワルツ!) 1988, Kodansha , Continuation of Can't Sleep on Birthday Eve
Evil Spirits Aren't Scary (悪霊なんかこわくない), 1989, Kodansha. 
Charmed 17 year old (呪われた17歳) 1990 朝日ソノラマ
17 Springs Passed (過ぎる十七の春 Sugiru Jūshichi no Haru), 1995, Kodansha. , an adaptation of Charmed 17 year old
 Green Home Spirits (グリーンホームの亡霊たち) 1990年朝日ソノラマ刊
 Home, Green Home (緑の我が家 Home、Green Home), 1997, Kodansha. 、an adaptation of Green Home Spirits
 Strange Tōkei Tales (東亰異聞 - Tōkei Ibun) (runner-up for the 1993 Japan Fantasy Novel Award), 1994, Shinchosha. 
 Shiki (屍鬼, literally Corpse Demon), 1998, Shinchosha. 
 Island of the Black Shrine (黒祠の島), 2001, Shodensha. 
 Kura no Kami (くらのかみ), 2003, Kodansha. 
Zan'e (残穢), 2012, Shinchosha.

Short story collection 
 Ghost Stories Storybook (鬼談百景). Serialized since June 2000 in the magazine Yuu. published in 2012

Short story 
 London, 1888 (倫敦、1888) 10/1993 Logout

References

External links
 Kōdansha's Twelve Kingdoms Site 
 J'Lit | Authors : Fuyumi Ono | Books from Japan

 
1960 births
20th-century Japanese novelists
21st-century Japanese novelists
Japanese fantasy writers
Japanese mystery writers
Living people
Light novelists
Japanese children's writers
Writers from Ōita Prefecture
Japanese horror writers
20th-century Japanese women writers
21st-century Japanese women writers
21st-century Japanese writers
Japanese women children's writers
Women horror writers